Kamaleswaram Mahadeva Temple is a temple for Shiva situated in Kamaleswaram, near by Govt. Kamaleswaram Higher Secondary School, Thiruvananthapuram, Kerala, India.

Geography
It is located at.

The management of the temple
The temple comes under the control of Travancore Devaswom Board.

Important days
Maha Shivaratri and Thiruvathira are the days which attract crowds to the temple.

Darsan
 Morning - 5.20 to 10.00
 Evening - 5.00 to 8.00

Deities and sub-deities 
The main deity of the temple is Hindu god Shiva.
There are many upadevathas (sub-deities) adjacent to the temple, and it was remade, according to the Deva Prashnam by expert astrologers recently.

The main upadevathas on the premises are

 Lord Ganesh
 Nagaraja
 Maadan Thampuran

References

See also
 List of Hindu temples in Kerala
 Sreekanteswaram

Hindu temples in Thiruvananthapuram district
Shiva temples in Kerala